Ira Francis Thompson (June 20, 1885 – August 4, 1937) was an associate justice of the Supreme Court of California from December 31, 1932, to August 4, 1937.

Early years
Born on a farm in Crawford County, Wisconsin, to James Franklin Thompson and Minerva Julia Drake, Thompson lost his father and mother when he was a child. At the age of 15, he moved to Eureka, California to begin high school, from which he graduated in 1904. After school, he worked part-time running errands at his uncle's newspaper, the Humboldt Standard.

Thompson studied at the University of California, Berkeley, where he paid his own school fees and finished a six-year law curriculum in four years, receiving both an A.B. and LL.B. degree in 1909. On July 2, 1909, he was admitted to the State Bar of California.

Career 
After graduation, Thompson worked in Oakland for a year for the firm of Reed, Black & Reed. Then Thompson moved to Los Angeles and began private practice with John F. Manning in the firm of Manning, Thompson & Hoover. Thompson immersed himself in civic causes and Republican Party politics.

In 1920, Thompson ran unsuccessfully on the Republican ticket for the position of judge of the Los Angeles County Superior Court. During the campaign, he gave a speech to the Sons of America opposing citizenship for Japanese immigrants. In 1923, Governor Friend Richardson appointed him a judge of the Los Angeles County Superior Court.

In October 1926, Governor Friend Richardson elevated Thompson to the position of Associate Justice of the Court of Appeal, Second District. He was re-elected to this office. In Summer 1928, he lectured on ethics at the University of Southern California.

On December 8, 1932, Governor James Rolph, Jr. appointed Thompson to the California Supreme Court to fill the vacant seat due to the death of John E. Richards. Thompson began his term on December 31, 1932, and the term expired January 1, 1935.  To fill Thompson's seat on the Court of Appeal, Governor Rolph appointed Judge Albert Lee Stephens Sr. of the Los Angeles Superior Court to the position. In November 1934, Thompson ran for re-election as a Republican and won a 12-year term.

Death 
On August 4, 1937, Thompson died while in office. Rolph filled the vacancy with the appointment of Frederick W. Houser to the Supreme Court.

Personal life
While at UC Berkeley, he met his future wife, Cora Hilda Manning. On June 1, 1910, they married and together had two children: Elizabeth and John.

Judicial experience 
 Judge, Los Angeles Superior Court, September 1, 1923 – October 4, 1926
 Associate Justice, California Court of Appeal, Second District, Division Two, October 5, 1926 –  December 30, 1932 
 Associate Justice, California Supreme Court, December 31, 1932 – August 4, 1937

Professional background 
 Lecturer on Legal Ethics, University of Southern California, 1926 – 1932
 Manning, Thompson & Hoover, 1910 – 1923 
 Reed, Black & Reed, 1909 – 1910

References

External links
Ira F. Thompson. California Supreme Court Historical Society.
In Memoriam, 9 Cal. Rpts. 2d 783 (1937).
Ira F. Thompson. California Court of Appeal, Second District, Division Two. 
 Past & Present Justices. California State Courts.

See also
 List of justices of the Supreme Court of California

1885 births
1937 deaths
Superior court judges in the United States
Judges of the California Courts of Appeal
Justices of the Supreme Court of California
20th-century American judges
20th-century American lawyers
University of California, Berkeley alumni
UC Berkeley School of Law alumni
California Republicans
Lawyers from Berkeley, California
Lawyers from San Francisco
University of Southern California faculty